The 2007 FIA GT3 European Championship season was second season of the FIA GT3 European Championship.  The season began on 6 May 2007, ended on 17 November 2007 and featured ten one-hour races over five rounds.

Schedule
Most races were one hour in length, and served as support races for the FIA GT Championship.

Season results

Championships

Teams Championship

References

Gt3
Fia gt3
FIA GT3 European Championship